Eastern Territories may refer to:

Nazi Germany
 Polish areas annexed by Nazi Germany, the "incorporated eastern territories" (Eingegliederte Ostgebieten)
 Reichskommissariat Ostland, the civilian occupation regime in the Baltic states (Estonia, Latvia, and Lithuania), in the northeastern part of Poland and in the western part of the Byelorussian Soviet Socialist Republic
 The occupied eastern territories (besetzten Ostgebiete) in the Soviet Union under the nominal administration of the Reich Ministry for the Occupied Eastern Territories

Post-war Germany
 Former eastern territories of Germany (Ehemalige deutsche Ostgebiete)

Poland
 Kresy, former eastern territories of Poland annexed by the Soviet Union in 1945